Munasinghe Arachchilage Don Bandu (16 March 1936 – 5 February 2005 as බන්දු මුණසිංහ [Sinhala]), popularly as Bandu Munasinghe, was an actor, and stunt director of Sri Lankan cinema. Particularly acted in cinema in villain roles, Munasinghe was the first stunt director of the Sri Lankan silver screen.

Personal life
He was born on 16 March 1936 in Borella. He first studied at Hewavitharana College, Rajagiriya and his secondary education at Nalanda College, Colombo. He excelled as a boxer. Because of this, he joined the army for a while after school and showed boxing skills.

He was married to Jayanthi Munasinghe where the wedding was celebrated on 16 March 1967.

Munasinghe, who had been a movie star for thirty-five years, suddenly fell ill in 1993. He went to Embilipitiya in Ratnapura where one of his leg was amputated. He died on 5 February 2005 at the age of 69.

Career
In 1958, he was invited in perform stunts to a film by M.P. Gilman and M.P. Gemunu, both stuntmen. They informed Munasinghe to be at Kiribathgoda Sirisena Wimalaweera's Nawajeevana studio at about 10 am. In Nawajeevana studio, he performed his maiden cinematic appearance in the film Ma Ale Kala Tharuniya. The second movie starring Munasinghe as a stuntman was Gilman's 1961 directorial hit Wedibima. Then he acted in the films, Daskon, Wena Swargayak Kumatada, Deepashika and Getawarayo. In 1965, he was selected for a villain role for the first time in his career in the film Saaravita. Later, he played as the stuntman in the films such as Dheewarayo, Satha Panaha, Sweep Ticket and Daru Duka.

He continued to work as the henchman in several movies for major villain characters most notably in the films, Surayangeth Suraya, Edath Suraya Adath Suraya, Hathara Denama Surayo, Singapore Charlie, Suli Sulang and Hitha Honda Minihek. His major breakthrough in cinema came through as the stunt director in the 1964 film Sithaka Mahima directed by M. S. Ananda. However, his first character role came through the film Tharangaa directed by Sena Dayananda. In the 1975 film Rajagedara Paraviyo by Sathischandra Edirisinghe, Munasinghe along with fellow stuntman Alexander Fernando created good realistic fight scenes.

He is also a skilled sword fight expert. He learned about sword fighting from Gamini Fonseka and H. D. Kulatunga. Among the characters played by Munasinghe were the scenes where the lead actress was tortured most notably in the film Awa Soya Adare. In the 1970s, he played the character roles of Agra Sajeewani and Manel Wanaguru in the films Sugandhi (1979) and Tharangaa (1975) respectively.

Filmography & Stunt Coordination

References

External links
 රොබින් ප්‍රනාන්දු ඇලුම් කළ අපේ සිනමාවේ සටන් නළුවන් හත් දෙනෙක්

Sri Lankan male film actors
Sinhalese male actors
1936 births
2005 deaths
Stunt performers
Alumni of Nalanda College, Colombo